Coleophora traganella is a moth of the family Coleophoridae. It is found in Algeria, Tunisia and Egypt.

The larvae feed on the leaves of Traganum nudatum.

References

traganella
Moths of Africa
Moths described in 1915